Sandeepa Dhar is an Indian actress who appears in Hindi films and Web series. She made her acting debut in 2010 with Isi Life Mein. For her performance in the film, she was nominated for Filmfare Award for Best Female Debut, Star Screen Award for Most Promising Newcomer and Stardust Award for Superstar of Tomorrow. Dhar did a cameo in Dabangg 2. Dhar also received critical acclaim for her performance in Sajid Nadiadwala's hit film Heropanti.

Early life and background 
Dhar was born in Srinagar, Jammu and Kashmir, India into a Kashmiri Pandit family. She is a professionally trained dancer. Having won several awards for her dancing, she trained in Bharatanatyam for 8 years from Vani Ganpathy. She also trained in Jazz and Contemporary for 4 years from Shiamak Davar and Terence Lewis. She is an alumna of NPS, Indira Nagar, Bangalore.

Career 

In 2010, Dhar made her cinematic debut in Rajshri Production's Hindi film Isi Life Mein  opposite actor Akshay Oberoi. Her performance was well received, earning the actress a best newcomer nomination at the Star Screen, Filmfare and Stardust Awards. Taran Adarsh praised her performance in the film saying, "Sandeepa Dhar is another talent that catches your attention."

Dhar's next release was Gollu Aur Pappu, produced by Viacom 18, co-starring Kunal Roy Kapur and Vir Das of Delhi Belly fame. She signed a 3-film deal with Viacom 18.

Filmography

Films

Web series

Music videos

Awards and nominations 

Nominated - Filmfare Best Female Debut Award
Nominated - Star Screen Award for Most Promising Newcomer – Female
Nominated - Stardust Award for Superstar of Tomorrow – Female

See also 

List of Indian film actresses

References

External links 

 
 
 

Actresses from Jammu and Kashmir
Living people
Kashmiri Pandits
Indian women
Indian people of Kashmiri descent
Indian film actresses
Actresses in Hindi cinema
Kashmiri people
People from Srinagar
Female models from Jammu and Kashmir
Actresses from Mumbai
21st-century Indian actresses
1989 births